Richard Tylinski (born 18 September 1937) is a former French football player and manager.

International career
Tylinski was born in France, and is of Polish descent. He is a former international footballer for France.

References

Profile at French federation official site
Profile and stats

Sportspeople from Allier
1937 births
Living people
French footballers
France international footballers
French people of Polish descent
AS Saint-Étienne players
Ligue 1 players
Ligue 2 players
Association football defenders
AC Avignonnais players
Footballers from Auvergne-Rhône-Alpes